Paul Ford Weaver (November 2, 1901 – April 12, 1976) was an American character actor who came to specialize in authority figures whose ineptitude and pompous demeanor were played for comic effect, notably as Mayor Shinn in The Music Man (1962) and as Colonel John T. Hall in The Phil Silvers Show.

Early years
Ford was born Paul Ford Weaver in Baltimore, Maryland. His father was described as "a well-to-do businessman" who lost his fortune when his investment in a soft-drink company failed.

At an early age, he showed an adept talent for performance, but was discouraged when directors thought he was tone-deaf. 

After attending Dartmouth College for one year, Ford was a salesman before he became an entertainer. 

He took his middle birth name, which was his mother's maiden name, as his stage last name. The change occurred after he failed an audition as Paul Weaver, but was successful when he auditioned again as Paul Ford.

Career
In later years, Ford made his voice one of the most recognized of his era. His success was long in the making, and he did little acting but instead raised his family during the Great Depression.

Franklin Delano Roosevelt's Public Works programs provided Ford with work, and to the day he died, he was a Democrat. He first ventured into entertainment, however, in a puppet theater project that the Works Progress Administration sponsored. Years later, he said of that opportunity: "I got on the puppet project of the W.P.A. and helped write and put on shows for the Federal Theater. We did puppet shows at the World's Fair in 1939 and 1940, and I served as narrator, a kind of Hoosier cornball in beard."

Following his experience with puppets, Ford worked as an attendant at a gas station before turning to acting for a career. His first professional acting job was in an Off-Broadway production in 1939.

In 1955, Ford played the bank president in the NBC comedy series Norby. He became an "overnight" success at age 54 when he played Colonel John T. Hall opposite Phil Silvers on Silvers' The Phil Silvers Show TV show (often known as Sergeant Bilko or just Bilko). 

His signature role may well be the part of Mayor George Shinn, a befuddled politico in the film adaptation of the Broadway show The Music Man. Ford played the role straight and received glowing reviews. The other role he is most identified with is that of Horace Vandergelder opposite Shirley Booth in the 1958 screen version of The Matchmaker. Ford had an active career in both films and television until his retirement in the early 1970s. 

Despite being a respected Broadway character actor, Ford was notorious for being unable to remember his lines. This would cause difficulty forcing him and those around him to improvise. This became especially notable on The Phil Silvers Show.

He appeared in the 1962–1963 season in the CBS anthology The Lloyd Bridges Show. He starred in The Baileys of Balboa, which lasted only one season (1964–1965).

His stage credits include Another Part of the Forest (1946), Command Decision (1947), The Teahouse of the August Moon (1953), Whoop-Up (1958), replacing David Burns as Mayor Shinn in The Music Man (1957), A Thurber Carnival (1960), Never Too Late (1962), 3 Bags Full (1966), and What Did We Do Wrong? (1967).

Most actors who worked with Ford claimed he was a kindly and very funny man. He was known for his quotes about the Depression in later years, including, "My kids used to think everyone lived on peanut butter sandwiches." 

His final role prior to his death was a Washington doctor in Richard.

Death
On 12 April 1976, Ford died of a heart attack at Nassau Hospital in Mineola, New York. He was 74. He was buried in Holy Cross Cemetery, Culver City, California. He was survived by his wife, two daughters, and two sons.

Recognition
Ford was nominated for three Primetime Emmy Awards: Best Supporting Performance by an Actor (1957), Best Continuing Supporting Performance by an Actor in a Dramatic or Comedy Series (1958) and Outstanding Performance in a Supporting Role by an Actor (1963). The first two were for his work on The Phil Silvers Show; the third was for a role on the Hallmark Hall of Fame.

Ford was nominated in 1963 for a Tony Award for Best Performance by a Leading Actor in a Play for Never Too Late.

Ford's obituary in The New York Times noted "In 1967 Mr. Ford was cited by the National Board of Review of Motion Pictures as the best supporting actor for his role in The Comedians."

Partial filmography

The House on 92nd Street (1945) as Police Sergeant (uncredited)
The Front Page (TV Movie 1945) 
The Naked City (1948) as Henry Fowler (uncredited)
Lust for Gold (1949) as Sheriff Lynn Early
All the King's Men (1949) as leader of the opposition in the state Senate (uncredited)
The Kid from Texas (1950) as Sheriff Copeland
Perfect Strangers (1950) as Judge James Byron
The Teahouse of the August Moon (1956) as Col. Wainwright Purdy III
The Missouri Traveler (1958) as Finas Daugherty
The Matchmaker (1958) as Horace Vandergelder
Keep in Step (TV Movie 1959) as Col. John T. Hall
The Right Man (TV Movie 1960) as Perfect Candidate
Advise and Consent (1962) as Senator Stanley Danta
The Teahouse of the August Moon (TV Movie 1962) as Col. Wainwright Purdy III
The Music Man (1962) as Mayor George Shinn
Who's Got the Action? (1962) as Judge Boatwright
It's a Mad, Mad, Mad, Mad World (1963) as Colonel Wilberforce 
Never Too Late (1965) as Harry M. Lambert
The Russians Are Coming, the Russians Are Coming (1966) as Fendall Hawkins
A Big Hand for the Little Lady (1966) as C.P. Ballinger
The Spy with a Cold Nose (1966) as American General
The Comedians (1967) as Smith
In Name Only (1969) as Elwy Pertwhistle
Twinky aka Lola (1969) as Mr. Wardman, Scott's Father
Fair Play (1972) as F. O. McGill
Richard (1972) as Washington Doctor
Journey Back to Oz (1974) as Uncle Henry (voice) (voice recorded in 1962)

References

External links

 
 
 
 
 

1901 births
1976 deaths
20th-century American male actors
American male film actors
American male musical theatre actors
American male radio actors
American male stage actors
American male television actors
American male voice actors
Dartmouth College alumni
Male actors from Baltimore
People from Nassau County, New York